Jacob Nguni (22 November 1956 – 25 April 2015), nicknamed "Pa Jay" or "Micro-wave", was a Cameroonian singer, high-life guitarist, activist, humorist whose partnership with late Prince Nico Mbarga as a lead guitarist produced songs like Sweet Mother that redefined the era of High-life music in Africa. The song would go on to become the Africa's best selling song with 13 million copies. The song was equally voted in 2004 in a BBC poll as Africa's favourite song.
He died in his sleep in the late hours of Saturday 25 April 2015 in Washington D.C.

Early years
Jacob Nguni was born on 22 November 1956 in Hausa Quarters, Kumba as the fourth and last son of Cameroonian parents Pa Boniface Nguni ( First World War Veteran) and Antonia Nguni. The young Jacob was a lover of music but his talented as guitarist was first spotted in college at Form 2, by his classmates at St Joseph's College Sasse, a prestigious catholic boy school located in the colonial town of Buea, Cameroon.   He is known to have practiced ferociously until he could play the popular tunes of James Brown, Jimmy Cliff and the licks of popular Congolese guitarists Vata Mombasa, Ricos Kinzoga, Lipua Lipua and Bella Bella. He otherwise excelled in his studies. Against all odds and the wishes of his father, he decided to go professional and left college for Nigeria, where he had in no time joined and become lead guitar of Prince Nico Mbarga’s Rocafil Jazz band. A few years later he resurfaced as lead guitarist with the A.B Waza at a tender age of 19.
The demo-tape of "Sweet Mother" was turned down by EMI in 1974, citing the song's "childish appeal." “Sweet Mother" was later also rejected by Decca Records and Philips Records, before it was eventually released in December 1976, by Rogers All Stars, a Nigerian recording company based in Onitsha. The song is a celebration of motherhood, sung in Nigerian Pidgin English introducing a new age of West African high life with Congolese Soukous-style guitar finger-picking.

Career
Jacob a small but promising gigs but what launched his career was his "Sweet Mother". The song was an instant hit as it went on to become one of the most popular hits in Africa, selling over 13 million copies. These days, the song has been labelled Africa's anthem after it was voted Africa's favourite song by BBC readers and listeners in 2004, edging South Africa's "Vuli Ndlela" by Brenda Fassie and "Lady" by Nigeria's Fela Kuti’s, Franco's"Mario" and Miriam Makeba’s version of "Malaika". From 1976 through to the early 1980s A.B Waza performed in over 20 African countries, and later, Europe.
In the early 80s Jacob left Prince Nico's Rocafil Jazz to form Waza Collection (later Waza Rocafil Jazz & A.B. Waza). Age 28 Jacob with the coming of his first daughter, he recorded the song "Congratulations" [my dear wife] on A.B Waza’sfirst album in 1984. The seminal high life tunes displayed more of the raw guitar licks and artistry that had propelled the Rocafil Jazz. Others songs "Never-Never",”Onitsha Township", "Daddy & Jummy" were well also received in and around West Africa. A.B Waza didn't release another album after however.
Through the 80's and 90's Jacob occasionally returned to Kumba where his rock star-status never faded with continued performances at the popular cabarets. He continued to work closely with Cameroon's high flying artists at the time in Douala and Yaounde including Sam Fan Thomas, Talla Andre Marie, Kotto Bass, Lapiro, Petit Pays. There were several collaborations with other of Africa's Soukouss top brass Sam Mangwana, Franco & TP.OK Jazz, The Kilimambogo Brothers.

An export of Rocafil Jazz for the West Indian market (Rocafil W.I) saw collaborations with Bod Guibert to create the "Super stars of Africa" album with songs like "Indifference" (sung in an Antillian language). In 1999, Jacob explored the music scene around Washington DC with a fleet of Cameroon musicians. There had been talks of a comeback mini-American tour of the cities with strong African presence by the old Rocafil Band around 2000. This didn't happen after the sudden death of his colleague and great friend Prince Nico Mbarga. He later returned moving his family in 2005 taking all his kids along with him, with focus on family life and giving his kids a chance. He continued to perform at the local Jazz festivals all through up to about 2010. His virtuosity with the guitar impressed artists at Washington DC mesmerized by his plucking and double stringed high-life playing style.

Jacob had become passionate about the plight of Cameroonians especially musical talents in the diaspora and hotly explored social issues in many online forums coined the handle "Microwave". Many on these popular forums recall his heated musings on those who opposed his ideology. He is remembered for his deep concern for those struggling with social issues and was outspoken about the deprived, health issues and Cameroon politics.
He was a member of the All Cameroonian Cultural & Development Foundation (ACCDF) and CAMUSA: Cameroonian Musicians Association of the United States. Along with his work in the Cameroonian Musician's Association CAMUSA, Jacob is known for many selfless smaller musical ventures. He co- wrote and produced several African gospel songs for local artists in his local Maryland hometown and beyond. Around 2010 Jacob formed the “Jacob Nguni & the Sweet Mother band” willingly performing a long line of songs at private family bereavements serving the endearing “Sweet Mother” anthem to halls of overjoyed families singing along all verses and choruses of the song.

Ill-health and death
He was diagnosed with leukemia early in 2010 and had survived numerous blast crises by the end of 2014. He was often keen to impress doctors with the knowledge of his own pretty serious symptoms and toyed with the idea of writing a book, an account from a patient's viewpoint. Jacob survived these seizures and surgery over the course of these five years often recovering to the point of being able to play bigger stages. His remains was brought back to Kumba, his hometown. He was laid to rest in his village of Dschang, in the Western Region of Cameroon

Family and friends
His eldest daughter, took care of him throughout his illness till the time of his death. He died on 25 April . Jacob leaves behind his daughter Cynthia Nguni and three sons Carrington Nguni, Stalone (Jr) Nguni, Prince Nguni.
Nguni was childhood friends and confidant of controversial makossa singer Lambo Sandjo Pierre Roger also known as "Lapiro de Mbanga". Their friendship grew stronger when they reunited in the United States after Lapiro had served a five-year jail term and died shortly after moving to the United States. Nguni said  "Lapiro used music to criticize the policies of the government and they did not like that and wanted to punish him"  According to him, Lapiro never forgave Cameroonian authorities for refusing him treatment when his illness was first diagnosed. 
He was also friends with makossa artist, Sam Fan Thomas.

References

1956 births
2015 deaths